Newcastle-under-Lyme Borough Council elections are held every four years. Newcastle-under-Lyme Borough Council is the local authority for the non-metropolitan district of Newcastle-under-Lyme in Staffordshire, England. Since the last boundary changes in 2018, 47 councillors have been elected from 21 wards. Prior to 2018 elections were held three years out of every four, with a third of the council elected each time.

Political control
The town of Newcastle-under-Lyme had been a municipal borough from 1836 to 1974 with a borough council. The first elections to the enlarged Newcastle-under-Lyme Borough created under the Local Government Act 1972 were held in 1973, initially operating as a shadow authority until the new arrangements came into effect on 1 April 1974. Political control of the council since 1974 has been held by the following parties:

Leadership
The leaders of the council since 1983 have been:

Council elections
1973 Newcastle-under-Lyme Borough Council election
1976 Newcastle-under-Lyme Borough Council election
1979 Newcastle-under-Lyme Borough Council election (New ward boundaries)
1980 Newcastle-under-Lyme Borough Council election
1982 Newcastle-under-Lyme Borough Council election
1983 Newcastle-under-Lyme Borough Council election
1984 Newcastle-under-Lyme Borough Council election
1986 Newcastle-under-Lyme Borough Council election
1987 Newcastle-under-Lyme Borough Council election
1988 Newcastle-under-Lyme Borough Council election
1990 Newcastle-under-Lyme Borough Council election
1991 Newcastle-under-Lyme Borough Council election (Borough boundary changes took place but the number of seats remained the same.)
1992 Newcastle-under-Lyme Borough Council election
1994 Newcastle-under-Lyme Borough Council election
1995 Newcastle-under-Lyme Borough Council election
1996 Newcastle-under-Lyme Borough Council election
1998 Newcastle-under-Lyme Borough Council election
1999 Newcastle-under-Lyme Borough Council election
2000 Newcastle-under-Lyme Borough Council election
2002 Newcastle-under-Lyme Borough Council election (New ward boundaries increased the number of seats by four.)
2003 Newcastle-under-Lyme Borough Council election
2004 Newcastle-under-Lyme Borough Council election
2006 Newcastle-under-Lyme Borough Council election
2007 Newcastle-under-Lyme Borough Council election
2008 Newcastle-under-Lyme Borough Council election
2010 Newcastle-under-Lyme Borough Council election
2011 Newcastle-under-Lyme Borough Council election
2012 Newcastle-under-Lyme Borough Council election
2014 Newcastle-under-Lyme Borough Council election
2015 Newcastle-under-Lyme Borough Council election
2016 Newcastle-under-Lyme Borough Council election
2018 Newcastle-under-Lyme Borough Council election (New ward boundaries and move to whole council elections.)
2022 Newcastle-under-Lyme Borough Council election

Borough result maps

By-election results

2001-2005

2005-2009

2009-2013

2013-present

The by-election was triggered by the death of Councillor Eileen Braithwaite.

The by-election was triggered by the resignation of Labour Knutton councillor Brian Johnson.

References

By-election results

External links
Newcastle-under-Lyme Borough Council

 
Politics of the Borough of Newcastle-under-Lyme
Council elections in Staffordshire
District council elections in England